Lamentation of Christ is a c. 1455–1460 painting by Flemish painter Dirk Bouts of the Lamentation of Christ. It was left to the Louvre Museum by Constant Mongé-Misbach in 1871, at which time it was misattributed to Rogier van der Weyden. It is still in that collection as RF 1.

References

1450s paintings
Paintings by Dieric Bouts
Paintings in the Louvre by Dutch, Flemish and German artists
Paintings of the Lamentation of Christ